Musical Opinion, often abbreviated to MO, is a European classical music journal edited and produced in the UK. It is currently among the oldest such journals to be still publishing in the UK, having been continuously in publication since 1877.

In its first year Musical Opinion critically reviewed Brahms' new Second Symphony, and in 1879 his Violin Concerto. The October 1936 issue carried an interview with Rachmaninov and championed the young William Walton as Britain's most exciting young composer.

In 1927, when the editor and proprietor was Arthur W. Fitzsimmons (d. 1948), the composer Havergal Brian became assistant editor of Musical Opinion. He held the post until 1940. This period could be said to have been its heyday: it was then a leading journal in its field, with each issue comprising over 100 large-format pages and a wide range of subject-matter (including much contemporary music) being covered by some of the most prominent British writers on music of the time. Regular contributors included Gerald Abraham, Eric Blom, Dmitri Calvocoressi, Eaglefield Hull, Alfred Kalmus, Basil Maine and Percy Scholes.

In 1921 Musical Opinion launched a sister magazine, The Organ.

Between 1984 and 2009, Musical Opinion was edited by Denby Richards. As of April 2009 its editor is Robert Matthew-Walker (who is editor of the Organ in addition).

From the time of its first issue (September 1877), Musical Opinion appeared monthly; but in the 1990s increasing production and postal costs threatened the magazine's survival. In 1994 Musical Opinion became a quarterly publication—with regular subscribers being kept up to date with information and reviews in the intervening months by means of 'Supplements' posted to them. In 2000 these supplements were reduced from two per quarter to one.

In 2003, however, Musical Opinion abandoned the idea of posted 'Supplements' and once more became a straightforward 'newsstand' publication appearing quarterly.

Notes

External links

Music magazines published in the United Kingdom
Quarterly magazines published in the United Kingdom
Classical music magazines
Magazines established in 1877
1877 establishments in the United Kingdom